The dozen Luo, Lwo or Lwoian languages are spoken by the Luo peoples in an area ranging from southern Sudan to western Ethiopia to southern Kenya, with Dholuo extending into northern Tanzania and Alur into the Democratic Republic of the Congo. They form one of the two branches of the Western Nilotic family, the other being the Dinka–Nuer. The Southern Luo varieties are mutually intelligible, and apart from ethnic identity they might be considered a single language.

The time depth of the division of the Luo languages is moderate, perhaps close to two millennia. The division within the Southern Luo language dialect cluster is considerably shallower, perhaps five to eight centuries, reflecting migrations due to the impact of the Islamization of the Sudan region.

Southern (Uganda and neighboring countries)
 Adhola (Uganda)
 Luo–Acholi
 Dholuo (Kavirondo Luo) (Kenya, Tanzania)
 Alur–Acholi
 Alur (Uganda, Democratic Republic of Congo)
 Acholi (Uganda, South Sudan)
Northern
Shilluk-collo (South Sudan)
Belanda Bor (South Sudan)
Thuri (South Sudan)
Jur languages
Jur (South Sudan)
Anuak (South Sudan, Ethiopia)
Päri (South Sudan)

Bibliography
 Gilley, Leoma G. 2004. "The Lwoian family." Occasional Papers in the Study of Sudanese Languages, 9, 165–174.

References 

 
Languages of Ethiopia
Languages of South Sudan
Languages of Sudan
Languages of the Democratic Republic of the Congo
Languages of Uganda
Languages of Kenya
Languages of Tanzania